Félix Rafael Cárdenas Ravalo (born November 24, 1973 in Encino, Santander) is a Colombian former road bicycle racer, who competed both as an amateur and as a professional between 1995 and 2014. He previously rode for UCI Professional Continental team  until the team's demise in 2009.

In the 2001 Tour de France, Cardenas took one of the biggest victory of his career on the mountainous stage 12. He crossed the line solo in Ax-les-Thermes, with Roberto Laiseka and Lance Armstrong rounding the podium. He performed his trademark victory salute, standing on the pedals with arms raised high in the air.

Major results

1996
 Clásico RCN
1st  Mountains classification
1st Stage 3
1998
 6th Overall Clásico RCN
1999
 3rd Overall Vuelta a Colombia
2000
 1st Mountains classification Tour de Romandie
 Tour du Limousin
1st Mountains classification
1st Stage 4
 1st Stage 10 Vuelta a España
2001
 1st Mountains classification Volta a Catalunya
 1st Stage 12 Tour de France
 10th Overall Euskal Bizikleta
2002
 1st Stage 4 Giro del Trentino
 Vuelta a Colombia
1st Stages 9 & 11
 5th Giro della Romagna
 7th Giro di Toscana
2003
 1st  Overall Vuelta a La Rioja
1st Mountains classification
1st Stage 3
 1st Stage 4 Vuelta a Castilla y León
 2nd Overall Vuelta a Colombia
1st Stages 7 & 11
 4th Subida al Naranco
 8th Overall Vuelta a España
1st  Mountains classification
1st Stage 16
2004
 Vuelta a España
1st  Mountains classification
1st Stage 17
 2nd Overall Clásico RCN
 2nd Overall Vuelta a Asturias
 7th Subida al Naranco
 8th Gran Premio de Llodio
2005
 1st  Overall Tour of Japan
1st Points classification
1st Mountains classification
1st Stages 3 & 5
 3rd Gran Premio Nobili Rubinetterie
 10th Overall Vuelta a Aragón
2006
 1st Prueba Villafranca de Ordizia
 1st Gran Premio Industria e Commercio Artigianato Carnaghese
 1st Stage 1 Brixia Tour
 6th Overall Giro del Capo
 9th Overall Peace Race
2007
 2nd Overall Giro del Capo
1st Stage 1
 2nd Overall Volta ao Alentejo
 2nd Gran Premio Nobili Rubinetterie
 7th Overall Settimana Ciclistica Lombarda
 8th Trofeo Melinda
2008
 6th Overall Giro del Capo
2009
 6th Overall Tour Méditerranéen
 7th Giro di Toscana
 8th GP Industria & Artigianato di Larciano
2010
 1st  Road race, National Road Championships
 1st  Overall Clásico RCN
2011
 1st  Overall Vuelta a Colombia
1st Stage 4
2012
 1st  Road race, National Road Championships
 1st  Overall Vuelta a Colombia
1st Points classification
1st Stages 3, 4 & 10
 2nd Overall Vuelta Ciclista de Chile
1st Stage 9
2013
 1st Stage 9 Vuelta a Colombia
2014
 1st Stage 8 Vuelta a Colombia
 7th Overall Vuelta al Táchira
 7th Overall Vuelta a la Independencia Nacional

References

External links
Profile at Barloworld official website

1972 births
Living people
Colombian male cyclists
Colombian Tour de France stage winners
Vuelta a Colombia stage winners
Sportspeople from Santander Department
Colombian Vuelta a España stage winners
21st-century Colombian people